Live in Brazil may refer to:

Live in Brazil (Nazareth album) (ru)
Live in Brazil (The Outfield album)
Live in Brazil (Dr. Sin album)
Live in Brazil 2002, an album by Concrete Blonde
Live in Brazil (Gary Williams album), 2013